Nikolai Danilov (April 25, 1867 – May 1934) was an Imperial Russian corps and army commander. He was promoted to Podpolkovnik (lieutenant colonel) in 1898, Polkovnik (colonel) in 1902, major general in 1908 and lieutenant general in 1911. After the October Revolution, he entered the service of the Soviet Red Army.

Works 
Historical overview of the development of military governance in Russia. ST. PETERSBURG, 1902.
Historical overview of the activities of the Office of the Ministry of war. ST. PETERSBURG, 1909.
The role of infantry in modern battle. ST. PETERSBURG, 1911.
The influence of the great world war on the economic situation in Russia: lectures, chitannye in the military engineering Academy at 1920-21 Stud. year. -PG, 1922.
Hybrid operation in the Gulf of Riga in June–August 1916, g.-l., Naval Academy of the RKKA, 1927.

Bibliography 
 
   (ACT);  (Астрель)

Sources 
 Биография Данилова Н.А. на сайте «Хронос»
 
 Воспоминания Г. И. Шавельского

1867 births
1934 deaths
Russian military personnel of World War I